The 2017–18 FA WSL Cup was the 7th edition of the FA WSL's league cup competition. It was sponsored by Continental AG, who have sponsored the competition since its creation, and is officially known as the FA WSL Continental Tyres Cup. All 20 teams of the two divisions of the WSL contest the competition - the largest field in the history of the cup.

Manchester City were the defending champions. Before the competition, only Manchester City and Arsenal had won the cup in the previous six seasons it was contested in.

Format changes
After a one-year experiment with a pure knockout formula, the WSL Cup returned to a format featuring a group stage. Four groups of five teams each, with an approximately even split between the two divisions, compete for two qualification spots for the knock-out round per group with each team playing every other team only once. Similarly to previous iterations of the cup, the groups have a geographical split, with two "Northern" groups and two "Southern". Another new implementation for the season was an automatic penalty shoot-out for all games tied after 90 minutes, with a bonus point awarded for the team who emerged victorious afterwards.

After the group stage, the remaining eight teams will contest a non-seeded standard knock-out format as in the 2015 season.

Group stage

Group One North

Group Two North

Group One South

Group Two South

Knock-out stage

Quarter-finals

Semi-finals

Final

Top goalscorers

See also
2017–18 FA WSL

References

External links
Official website

FA Women's League Cup
1